Vaudan is a surname. Notable people with the surname include:

 Delia Vaudan, Italian luger
 Emmanuel Vaudan (b. 1971), Swiss ski mountaineer and runner
 Mary-Jérôme Vaudan (b. 1965), Swiss ski mountaineer mountain and runner
 Gabriel Vaudan (b. 1977), Mexican, Captain on vessels